Mascaraque is a municipality located in the province of Toledo, Castile-La Mancha, Spain. According to the 2006 census (INE), the municipality had a population of 550 inhabitants.

History 
The origin of the town goes back to the times of Arab domination. Its castle was built in the 14th century, and renovated in 1518 when it was turned into the fortress-palace of Juan de Padilla. At that time locality acquired the category of Villa that differentiated it from the nearby villages.

Today Mascaraque can testify to the urban aspirations characteristic of a Villa, with its castle-fortress and several small palaces with distinctive shields.

During the War of Independence, the municipal archives were burned, so that little information is known about the past of the municipality. During the 19th century, it resisted the occupation of the Carlistas, and the population was defended with a militia of its own. During the invasion by the forces of Basilio (1837-1838), Mascaraque was the only population in the area which refused to give supplies requested by the Carlist Generals, reason why the later government authorized them to include the phrase: "They did not fear" in their coat of arms.

Monuments 
 Castle of Mascaraque, built in 14th century. Ruined by wars, it was bought by José Manuel Sierra Frade and totally rebuilt between 1980–85.
 Church of Santa María  Magdalena: 18th century
 Ermita de Los Cristos: small chapel. Today it stores some reproductions of paintings by Juan Correa de Vivar

Notable people
 Pedro López de Padilla: Mayor of Toledo early 16th century; Son of Sancho de Padilla (builder of Mascaraque Castle) and father of  Juan de Padilla (1490-1521).
 Juan Correa de Vivar (1510?-1566): Renaissance painter
 Ana de Sande y Padilla (1610-1659): First duchess of Abrantes, II marquise de Valdefuentes
 Pablo Manzano Arellano (1855-1949): painter
 José Manuel Sierra Frade: Did the reconstruction of the Castle as its new owner in 1980-85
 Faustino Lara Ibáñez (current): contemporary novelist
 María de Gracia Peralta Martín (current): contemporary poet
 Daniel Garbade (1957 -) Swiss Artist and Art Director (Espion leve toi) has lived there since 1987, sculptor of Bakunin’s grave. Co-founder of Signos Magazine
  (1953 -):National Award in photography, lived in Mascaraque until 1987

References

Municipalities in the Province of Toledo